The 2015–16 season was Aberdeen's 102nd season in the top flight of Scottish football and the third in the Scottish Premiership. Aberdeen also competed in the League Cup and the Scottish Cup and the Europa League.

Season summary
Aberdeen finished second in the season. Shay Logan, Jonny Hayes, Kenny McLean and Graeme Shinnie  were named in PFA Scotland Team of the Year.

Pre-season and friendlies

Scottish Premiership

Results

UEFA Europa League

Aberdeen qualified for the first preliminary round of the UEFA Europa League by finishing second in the 2014-15 Scottish Premiership.

Qualifying phase

Scottish League Cup

Scottish Cup

Squad statistics
During the 2015–16 season, Aberdeen have used twenty-three different players in competitive games. The table below shows the number of appearances and goals scored by each player.

Appearances

|-
|colspan="10"|Players who left the club during the 2015–16 season
|-

|}

Goalscorers

Disciplinary record

Team statistics

Scottish Premiership

League table

Results by round

Results summary

Results by opponent
Aberdeen score first

Source: 2015–16 Scottish Premier League Results Table

Transfers

Players in

Players out

Loans in

Loans out

See also
 List of Aberdeen F.C. seasons

References

Aberdeen F.C. seasons
Aberdeen
2015–16 UEFA Europa League participants seasons